José de Nouvilas de Vilar (1856 – 1931) was Mayor of Ponce, Puerto Rico, from 3 January 1893 to 9 August 1894. He was a soldier in the Spanish military and held the rank of "General de Brigada".

Background
Nouvilas de Vilar had been Ponce Police Chief immediately prior to his first day as mayor. He had garnished the sympathy of the townspeople for his fair application of law enforcement, in particular for the treatment of residents during the popular and commercial protests of 7–10 September 1892 to the Madrid's tax increase. During these protests Nouvilas de Vilar had prohibited his police force from using any violence against the residents.

Mayoral term
Nouvilas became mayor of Ponce on 3 January 1893 and he mayored the municipality until 9 August 1894. During this time he spearheaded the development of a working group of women for the creation of a shelter for Ponce's homeless elderly. In 1893, noticing the large number of elderly beggars that crowded the city streets, he had the urge that something needed to be done to help these group of people. A significant amount from the estate of Miguel Arribas was also donated to the municipality for this purpose. As a result of his leadership, and the many donations that came in, by November 1894 an Asilo de Ancianos (Shelter for the Elderly) opened at Calle Mendez Vigo #37.  Later, encountering declining health, Nouvilas de Vilar traveled to the Peninsula for medical treatment, from where he resigned his mayoral post. However, under the pretext of public safety, he also ordered the "alcaldes de barrio" to "enter all private homes in their jurisdiction and assess their physical condition."

Legacy
Nouvilas is remembered for issuing an anti-prostitution edict, the Reglamento de Higiene de la Prostitución (Prostitution Higiene Decree), intended to "correct immorality in Ponce".

See also

 List of Puerto Ricans
 List of mayors of Ponce, Puerto Rico

Notes

References

Further reading
 Ramon Marin. Las Fiestas Populares de Ponce. Editorial Universidad de Puerto Rico. 1994. 
 Eileen J. Suarez Findlay. Imposing Decency: The Politics of Sexuality and Race in Puerto Rico, 1870-1920. Duke University Press. 1999.
 Fay Fowlie de Flores. Ponce, Perla del Sur: Una Bibliográfica Anotada. Second Edition. 1997. Ponce, Puerto Rico: Universidad de Puerto Rico en Ponce. p. 256. Item 1287. 
 Government of Puerto Rico. Circular del Gobierno General sobre incendios, Junio 6 de 1893. Ponce, Puerto Rico: Establecimiento Tipográfico de M. Lopez. 1893. (Archivo Histórico de Ponce, AHP).
 Fay Fowlie de Flores. Ponce, Perla del Sur: Una Bibliográfica Anotada. Second Edition. 1997. Ponce, Puerto Rico: Universidad de Puerto Rico en Ponce. p. 335. Item 1669. 
 Ponce. Presupuesto municipal para el ejercicio 1893 a 1894. Ponce, Puerto Rico: Tipografía El Vapor, s.f. (Universidad de Puerto Rico, Rio Piedras)

External links
 Guardia Civil española (c. 1898) (Includes military ranks in 1880s Spanish Empire.)

Mayors of Ponce, Puerto Rico
1840s births
1910s deaths
Year of birth uncertain
Year of death uncertain